Shun may refer to one of the following:

To shun, which means avoiding association with an individual or group
Shun (given name), a masculine Japanese given name
Seasonality in Japanese cuisine (shun, 旬)

Emperor Shun
 Emperor Shun (舜; between c. 2294 and 2184 BC), a legendary leader of ancient China
 Emperor Shun of Han (順帝; 115–144), the Han emperor
 Emperor Shun of Liu Song (順帝; 467–479), the Southern emperor
 Li Zicheng (1606–1645), the sole member of the short-lived Shun Dynasty

Other
Shun Dynasty, dynasty established by Li Zicheng in 1644
"Shun" (song), a 2009 song by musician Ringo Sheena.
SHUN, an Internet Relay Chat command, used to prevent a user sending messages to a server's channels
Shun Cutlery
Shun (band), a music unit led by Susumu Hirasawa
SYUN, a label created by Hirasawa  under DIW Records named after the group